Twogether may refer to:
Twogether (film), 1992
Twogether (Bucky Pizzarelli and John Pizzarelli album), 2001
Twogether (John Hicks and Frank Morgan album), 2005–06
Twogether (TV program), 2020